A list of American films released in 1911.

See also
 1911 in the United States

External links

1911 films at the Internet Movie Database

1911
Films
Lists of 1911 films by country or language
1910s in American cinema